Setareki "Seta" Tawake Naivaluwaqa (born 1 March 1969 in Kavala, Kadavu) is a retired Fijian rugby union player, who was capped for Fiji on 31 occasions. He played as Openside flanker or Number 8. He played in two Rugby World Cups. He was also a soldier

Tawake played both 7's and 15's. He studied at Nasinu Secondary School and he represented them in both 7's and 15's rugby. He made his international debut in 15's against Samoa on 20 June 1992 in Suva.

He represented the Fiji sevens starting in 1996, until helping them to win the 1998 Hong Kong sevens. He was also part of the Fiji team to the 1998 Commonwealth Games where he was part of the silver winning team. He later played represented Suva in the Digicel Cup but missed three seasons while on peacekeeping duties in the Middle East. He also played his rugby in Japan. He missed most of the 2000-01 international seasons to play for his club in Brisbane, where he was based from 1996. He re-joined to the Test side for the RWC qualifiers in June 2002 and went to the 2003 Rugby World Cup but didn't play any game.

After rugby
His memorable experience was when he played five Tests in a row during the 1999 World Cup where he played all his games for the full 80 minutes. He later coached the Akita Northern Bullets

References

External links
 

1969 births
Fijian rugby union players
Rugby union flankers
Fiji international rugby union players
Living people
People from Kadavu Province
Commonwealth Games medallists in rugby sevens
Male rugby sevens players
Commonwealth Games silver medallists for Fiji
Rugby sevens players at the 1998 Commonwealth Games
Commonwealth Games rugby sevens players of Fiji
Medallists at the 1998 Commonwealth Games